New Drifters may refer to:
New Drifters, a band headed by Ray Lewis
"New Drifters", the title of four songs by The American Analog Set from their 1999 album The Golden Band
"New Drifters I"
"New Drifters II"
"New Drifters II"
"New Drifters IV"